Lee Hyo-jung (born January 7, 1961) is a South Korean actor. Lee made his acting debut in 1981, and continues to star in television dramas.

Filmography

Television series

Film

Theater

Awards and nominations

References

External links 
 
 
 

1961 births
Living people
South Korean male television actors
South Korean male film actors
South Korean male stage actors
South Korean male musical theatre actors
People from Seoul
Dongguk University alumni